This is a list of points scoring systems used to determine the outcome of the seasonal motorsports championships. Points are usually awarded after the placement in the individual races. In addition, there may be bonus points for fastest training laps, fastest race laps, leading laps or other individual criteria. In some racing series, for example the IndyCar Series, the driver who starts the race on pole position receives additional points or there are points for qualification trainings or qualification races.

There are two basic systems. Either all drivers who finish the race or enter the final standings receive points. Or only a certain number of top placements get points and the higher ranks are not counted for the championship, except as a tiebreaker. For historical reasons, the points systems have prevailed in Australian and American Touring car racing as well as in Endurance racing, where all drivers get points, while in Formula racing (Grand Prix) usually only the top positions are valid for the championship points.

Race points only to Top ranks 
 Points given to some of the top ranks in race result. There can be zero point results in race. In small support series with a small number of starters, all drivers can still get points if they are scored in the finish.

Points up to Top 8 ranks

Points up to Top 12 ranks

Points up to Top 15 ranks

Points up to Top 20 ranks

Points up to Top 25 ranks

Race points to all ranks 
 The allocation of points is based on the maximum number of cars participating in the championship or maximum number of starting spots for the races. Usually, all drivers entering the races receive championship points at the end of race. If more cars are allowed to qualifying for individual races than were originally intended, zero point scores can also occur here. In rare cases, surplus cars still receive points for the championship. For example, in 1997, the points scoring system of the Indy Racing League was briefly expanded to 35 positions for this one season, since exceptionally 35 drivers could start in the 1997 Indy 500.

Points up to Top 35 ranks

Points up to Top 60 ranks

Points for qualifying 
 Points given to ranks in qualifying result or qualifying races.

Bonus points 
 Additional points given to fastest practice laps, fastest racing laps or led laps or other criteria.

Points multiplicator 
In addition to the base points, there were and are racing series with points multipliers.

Until the 1982 season, AAA, USAC and CART used a multiplier system based on the mileage of the races. The base points were only available for races up to 150 miles in length. Double points were awarded for races of 150 to 250 miles, triple points for races of 250 to 350 miles, quadruple points for races of 350 to 450 miles and five times for races over 450 miles, e.g. the Indy 500.
In addition to the prize money, important races on large race tracks should be made more attractive and lead to larger driver fields.

In the 1996 season there was a multiplier for the number of races that a driver contested. This was to prevent drivers who only competed in one or two of the three races of the season from winning the championship. If a driver drove all three races of the first IRL season, his points were multiplied by 3. The two co-champions of the season received 246 points instead of the 82 earned base points as a final result based on IRL points scoring system of 1996.

In NASCAR, the points were decided in the first two decades according to the importance of the race and the price money. So there were multipliers for certain prize money amounts. In the late 1960s and early 1970s, like the IndyCar, there was a multiplier based on the length of the races, before a uniform points system was used from 1975 onwards.

In endurance racing, instead of fixed multiplicators, different points scoring systems are used for races of different lengths. Usually the point systems differ only in the addition of fixed point values to all placements.

Championship decision 
The final result of the championship is usually determined by the sum of the championship points won. If the points are the same, there will be tiebreaker in the form of the number of the highest positions in the individual races, e.g. number of victories, number of second places etc.

An inverted system was used in Europe before World War II. The driver with the fewest points won the championship there. The winner got 1 "penalty point", the second-placed driver 2, the third-placed driver 3, all other drivers got 4. Drivers who did not finish the race received additional "penalty points", based on the percentage distance they run.

In some racing series, especially in NASCAR, there is a playoff system. After a cutoff race determined at the beginning of the season, the points score is used to qualify for the playoff after that race. In the subsequent races, other selection procedures are used to decide the championship, for example a knockout phase in which only a certain number of drivers, determined by points scoring and number of victories, reach the next round. In the last race, only the direct placement against the other competing drivers decides the outcome of the championship.

See also 
 List of FIM World Championship points scoring systems
 List of Formula One points scoring systems

External links 
 Formula E Rules and Regulations
 NTT INDYCAR SERIES Championship Points
 How NASCAR driver points are awarded per race
 Super Formula overhauls points system for 2020
 WTCR FORMAT EXPLAINED: A QUICK REMINDER

Motorsport-related lists